The Anthropocene Reviewed is the shared name for a podcast and 2021 nonfiction book by John Green. The podcast started in January 2018, with each episode featuring Green reviewing "different facets of the human-centered planet on a five-star scale". The name comes from the Anthropocene, the proposed geological epoch that includes significant human impact on the environment. Episodes typically contain Green reviewing two topics, accompanied by stories on how they have affected his life. These topics included intangible concepts like humanity's capacity for wonder, artificial products like Diet Dr. Pepper, natural species that have had their fates altered by human influence like the Canada goose, and phenomena that primarily influence humanity such as Halley's Comet.

The podcast was released monthly until September 2020, when Green announced he was putting the podcast on hiatus as he adapted it into a book. The Anthropocene Reviewed: Essays on a Human-Centered Planet, was published by Dutton Penguin on May 18, 2021, featuring revised essays from the podcast and several new essays. The book received positive reviews and debuted at number one on The New York Times Best Seller list. After the release of a four-episode season accompanying the publication of the book, Green announced he did not have plans to release any further episodes.

Podcast

Each podcast typically covers two topics, which have included a diverse range of subjects including celestial phenomena, works of art, diseases, and human emotions. The subjects ultimately serve as starting points into explorations of Green's own life and perspectives in the form of memoir-like essays, which have been described as "thought-provoking reviews [that] use a blend of poetry, historical detail and humor."

Background
The premise for the podcast was borne from a number of sources. Green worked for the book review journal Booklist in the early 2000s, where he reviewed hundreds of books over the course of five years, sparking his interest in reviews as a literary format.

In October 2017, after the release of Green's most recent novel, Turtles All the Way Down, he and his brother Hank Green went on a book tour. As they travelled across the country, they passed the time by finding Google user reviews for the places they were passing that they considered absurd, such as a one-star review for Badlands National Park. While reflecting on the increased prevalence that reviews and the five-star scale had taken in modern life, John told Hank he had once had an idea to write a review on Canada geese, to which Hank responded, "The Anthropocene... reviewed!"

A few months later, John shared some reviews he had written in 2014 on Canada geese and Diet Dr Pepper with his wife, Sarah Urist Green. After noting that John wrote the reviews in a nonfiction form of third-person omniscient narration, Sarah pointed out that reviews often act as a form of memoir, saying that, "in the Anthropocene, there are no disinterested observers; there are only participants." John cited this as a major reason he chose to put more of himself into the reviews.

John Green, in the introduction to The Anthropocene Reviewed book, also revealed that he had begun to have trouble writing fiction because of the ways readers were conflating his protagonists views with his own. Green specifically referenced a 2017 Allegra Goodman quote, "I seem to be writing it myself, but since I'm a novelist, it's all in code." In an interview with The New York Times in June 2021, Green elaborated, stating that, "I didn't want to write in code anymore. I wanted to try to write as myself because I've never done that in any formal way."

Post-debut
The podcast's first episode was published on January 29, 2018. Green reflected in a November 2018 interview with Vulture that, "The Anthropocene Reviewed is an opportunity for me to get back to my roots. With the podcast, I want to pay careful and sustained attention to the world around me, and that's something I often feel like I don't do, especially when I'm on the internet."

In June 2019, Roman Mars interviewed Green about his show in an episode of 99% Invisible which also featured the reviews from episodes six and nine. The Lascaux Paintings essay from episode six was also adapted into an animated visualization by the German YouTube channel Kurzgesagt in May 2020.

In August 2019, John and Hank performed live versions of their podcasts on stage, with John presenting a new episode of The Anthropocene Reviewed, as well as a live episode of their shared podcast Dear Hank & John. The live performances returned in March 2020 with a planned three-city tour including stops in Columbus, Ohio and Carmel, Indiana, with a third performance set for Ann Arbor, Michigan. However, the third performance was cancelled due to the onset of the COVID-19 pandemic in the United States.

On the August 2020 episode titled "The Anthropocene Reviewed, Reviewed", Green announced he would be taking a hiatus from the podcast after the following month's episode in part to work on a book adaptation of the podcast. In April 2021, the podcast returned for a four-episode season coinciding with the release of the book. The fourth episode was released on August 26, 2021, with Green commenting the day before in a video posted to his Vlogbrothers YouTube channel that he believed the episode would be his last. He stated, "Working on The Anthropocene Reviewed has been an incredible experience, but I think I'm ready to go back to writing fiction... maybe?"

Book

The Anthropocene Reviewed: Essays on a Human-Centered Planet was published by Dutton Penguin on May 18, 2021, Green's first nonfiction book and sixth solo publication. The book features revised versions of many of the essays from the podcast, as well as new original essays, ordered chronologically through Green's life to give the book the approximate structure of a memoir. Green wrote about living through the COVID-19 pandemic in many of the essays. He also narrated the audiobook, which was released simultaneously with the hardcover. In addition to the English version, translated versions were released in German, Spanish, Portuguese, Italian, and Dutch.

As he had done with many of his previous books, Green signed all 250,000 tip-in sheets of the first printing for the United States and Canada. He wrote a review of the experience on the final signed page. This review was later revised and expanded on for an episode of the podcast released on the same day as the book. Green hosted a virtual book tour, with guests Clint Smith, Latif Nasser, Sarah Urist Green, Hank Green, and Ashley C. Ford making appearances at the various shows.

In November 2021, John Green announced an accompanying zine sold through the Green brothers' e-commerce store DFTBA.com. The zine is 20 pages long and contains reviews from John Green and Stan Muller, a poem by Rosianna Halse Rojas, and illustrations by Nadim Silverman.
 
In April 2022, the book was chosen to be the 2022 common read at the University of Mississippi. Green gave a keynote address at the university's annual fall convocation.

Reception
The book received positive reviews and sold well, with more than 57,000 copies purchased during its first week.  It debuted as a number one New York Times Best Seller in the Combined Print & E-books Nonfiction and Hardcover Nonfiction categories, staying on the latter list for nine weeks. It was subsequently listed at number six on the American Booksellers Association's Year-End 2021 Bestseller List in the category of hardcover nonfiction. Booklist, Library Journal, Publishers Weekly, and Shelf Awareness all gave starred reviews, with the last stating that "each of the 44 entries [...] is a small gem, polished to near perfection." Adam Frank reviewing the book for NPR wrote how each essay, "is a web of salient and unexpected connections." Elizabeth Greenwood from The San Francisco Chronicle wrote, "The Anthropocene Reviewed is the perfect book to read over lunch or to keep on your nightstand, whenever you need a reminder of what it is to feel small and human, in the best possible way." Scott Neumyer of Shondaland wrote that, "Green may have made his name by writing fiction (and for good reason), but this first foray into nonfiction is his most mature, compelling, and beautifully written book yet."

In November 2021, the book was named to the longlist for the 2022 Andrew Carnegie Medals for Excellence in Fiction and Nonfiction. The book also won the 2021 Goodreads Choice Award in the category of Best Nonfiction.

Reviews

Podcast episodes
Ratings are presented in the order that topics are listed in the title, regardless of order presented within the episode.

Text-based reviews
Reviews in The Anthropocene Reviewed book originally from the podcast are excluded from the table below.

References

Notes

External links

2018 podcast debuts
2021 non-fiction books
American podcasts
Anthropocene
Books about the COVID-19 pandemic
Educational podcasts
Essay collections
Memoirs
WNYC Studios programs
Works by the Green brothers
Podcasts adapted for other media